The 2007 NASCAR Craftsman Truck Series season was the thirteenth season of the third highest stock car racing series in North America. Sanctioned by NASCAR, the season began on February 16, 2007, at Daytona International Speedway with the Chevy Silverado HD 250, and ended on November 16, 2007, with the Ford 200 at Homestead-Miami Speedway. Ron Hornaday Jr. of Kevin Harvick, Inc. was crowned champion.

Top storylines
One month before the season started, team owner and driver Bobby Hamilton succumbed to cancer.
Two series drivers, Tyler Walker and Aaron Fike, were suspended by NASCAR indefinitely for violations of the organization's substance abuse program. Fike's suspension came after he and his girlfriend were arrested on possession charges at the parking lot of the Kings Island theme park near Cincinnati, Ohio.
Ted Musgrave, the 2005 champion, was suspended for one race due to an altercation with Kelly Bires during a caution period at the Toyota Tundra Milwaukee 200 at the Milwaukee Mile. In the race Musgrave sat out, Brad Keselowski almost drove the No. 9 truck to victory until a late-race crash with Travis Kvapil took him out. Keselowski's performance is credited with his discovery by JR Motorsports and eventually signing with that Busch Series team.
Mike Skinner won three straight races (California, Atlanta and the first at Martinsville) and led in poles as well. Skinner led the standings all season until the race at Gateway International Raceway, when he was overtaken by Ron Hornaday Jr.
Tripp Bruce, crew chief for the No. 23 team and driver Johnny Benson, was suspended for two races for allowing a driver not licensed by NASCAR to test the truck at Lowe's Motor Speedway. The team and Benson Jr. also lost 25 points in the respective standings and Bruce was fined.
Speed Channel began a new eight-year contract to continue NCTS telecasts, but two races were moved to Fox. The second of those, the Ohio 250 at Mansfield Motorsports Park, aired on that network for only 19 laps before rain came and the rest of the event aired on Speed Channel while Major League Baseball on Fox aired on the main network. However, most of the race was moved to tape delay due to more rain and a conflict with the Busch Series race at Lowe's Motor Speedway running simultaneously (NASCAR prohibits more than one national series from being televised at the same time). The other Fox telecast was the Kroger 250 at Martinsville Speedway.

Schedule
The season schedule consisted of 25 races held at tracks across the United States.

Television coverage
Fox-owned Speed again covered the entire 2007 Truck Series season, except for two races on Fox.

Teams and drivers

Complete schedule

Limited Schedule

Notes

Driver changes
 On May 29, Bill Davis Racing driver Tyler Walker was suspended indefinitely by NASCAR for failing to follow its substance abuse policy. Driver Ryan Mathews took his place.
 On June 27, Germain Racing driver Ted Musgrave was suspended for one race by NASCAR following an altercation with Kelly Bires at the Milwaukee Mile. Brad Keselowski replaced him at Memphis.
 On July 9, Red Horse Racing driver Aaron Fike, along with his fiancée were stopped in Warren County, Ohio, and were arrested for possession of heroin. Fike along with his fiancée were later suspended by NASCAR for the incident. Busch Series champion David Green and Jason Leffler split time in the RHR truck for the rest of the season.
 On August 14, Green Light Racing dropped driver Chad McCumbee from the No. 08 team. Shane Sieg drove the No. 08 at Bristol.
 On August 20, McCumbee replaced Blake Bjorklund at MRD Motorsports in the No. 8 Truck.

Also, beginning this season, the trucks will be identical from the windshield to the rear of the truck. However, the noses will continue to be branded as the Chevrolet Silverado, Dodge Ram, Ford F-150, and Toyota Tundra.

Races

Chevrolet Silverado HD 250
This race was held February 16 at Daytona International Speedway. Jack Sprague won the pole and would win the race from the pole. On the final lap, Travis Kvapil, only a few yards short of taking the second consecutive victory at Daytona for the 6 truck, was passed by the Toyota Tundras of Sprague on the high side and Johnny Benson, who had given Sprague a bump, near (but not on) the apron in a three-wide finish reminiscent of the 2003 Daytona race which ironically Kvapil also lost.

Top ten results:

Failed to qualify: Wayne Edwards (No. 95)

San Bernardino County 200
This race was held February 23 at California Speedway. Carl Edwards won the pole in the Roush Fenway Racing No. 50 truck. On one of the 2nd from the final restart No. 33 Ron Hornaday Jr. spun out No. 21 Mark Martin due to a slow restart, the caution flag was soon waved but not until after No. 5 Mike Skinner made the pass for the lead. NASCAR did not issue any penalties to the No. 33 team and Mark Martin after the spin ended up finishing 23rd. On the final restart, Skinner held off No. 33 Ron Hornaday to get his first truck series win since last year at Las Vegas.

Top ten results:

Failed to qualify: None (34 entries)

American Commercial Lines 200
The American Commercial Lines 200 was held March 16 at Atlanta Motor Speedway. Mike Skinner won the pole. In another exciting race for the NCTS, Nextel Cup Series regular Clint Bowyer held the lead on a restart with seven laps to go. While he tried to bunch up the field on a restart, California winner Mike Skinner bumped Bowyer out of the way and went on to win his second consecutive race. Despite the bump and run, Bowyer finished 5th.

Top ten results:

Failed to qualify: None (35 entries)

Kroger 250
The Kroger 250 was held on April 1 at Martinsville Speedway. Mike Skinner won the pole. Skinner would win his third consecutive race and second in a row from pole. Skinner dominated the Martinsville short track, leading 246 laps, easily breaking Rich Bickle's old record of leading 204 laps en route to victory in 1997.

Top ten results:

Failed to qualify: Bradley Riethmeyer (No. 49), Brian Sockwell (No. 54), Shane Sieg (No. 28), Chris Jones (No. 87), Tim Cowen (No. 42)

O'Reilly Auto Parts 250
The O'Reilly Auto Parts 250 was held on April 28 at Kansas Speedway. This race was moved from its traditional July weekend to late April in hopes of cooler temperatures. It was also held in conjunction with the IndyCar Series' event, the Kansas Indy 300. The race was dominated by 2006 Raybestos Rookie of the Year Erik Darnell, who would lead 91 of 166 laps en route to his first career NCTS victory. Darnell's win ended the win streak of Mike Skinner, who started from the pole but had trouble in the pits.

Top ten results:

Failed to qualify: None (36 entries)

Quaker Steak & Lube 200
The Quaker Steak & Lube 200 was held on May 18 at Lowe's Motor Speedway. Mike Skinner won the pole. The race saw a classic showdown between truck series veteran Ron Hornaday Jr. and Nextel Cup Series rookie A. J. Allmendinger. However, the veteran stole the show by passing Allmendinger with 36 laps to go. It looked like Hornaday might coast to victory, but Johnny Benson, who had already been in controversy during the week, cut a tire with 11 laps to go. However, Hornaday held off Allmendinger and Todd Bodine to take his first truck victory of the season. The win also gave Chevrolet its first truck win since Texas last year.

Top ten results:

Failed to qualify: Jason White (No. 7)

Johnny Benson allowed a non-licensed NASCAR driver to test his truck, and was assessed a 50-point penalty.

NCTS Ohio 250
The NCTS Ohio 250 was held on May 26 at Mansfield Motorsports Park. Mike Skinner won the pole. In a race that featured much attrition and varying strategies, it seemed as though Matt Crafton would be able to end his 154 race winless drought by going on an unbelievable no-stop strategy. However, two six-hour rain delays held up his goal. Although Crafton had the lead after the delay, he soon lost the top spot to Rick Crawford and would eventually blow out a tire. Crawford, meanwhile, dominated the race, leading the most laps, as his only contenders were rookie Aaron Fike and "Short Track Slayer" Dennis Setzer. When it seemed as though Crawford would sail to an easy win, he cut down a tire with 11 laps to go, handing the lead to Setzer. For Setzer, it had been almost 2 years since he last won a race, and for his Spears Racing team, they had not won since Phoenix in 2004. The crafty veteran outlasted the competition on a shocking no stop strategy to win. Second-place finisher Jack Sprague said that it was unbelievable that Setzer won without pitting.

Top ten results:

Failed to qualify: Kelly Sutton (No. 51)

AAA Insurance 200
The AAA Insurance 200 was held June 1 at Dover International Speedway. Mike Skinner won his sixth consecutive pole. This race was a historic milestone for the NASCAR Craftsman Truck Series, as it was the series' 300th race. The race featured early attrition, including a six-truck pileup on the first lap involving Cup drivers Clint Bowyer and Ken Schrader, along with truck drivers Brendan Gaughan, Bill Lester, Erik Darnell, and Jack Sprague. From the outset, it appeared as though Kyle Busch would walk away with another victory at Dover. However, Ron Hornaday Jr. began to catch up to Busch, who was having handling problems. Hornaday would eventually win by 7 seconds over Stacy Compton.

Top ten results:

Failed to qualify: None (36 entries)

Sam's Town 400
The Sam's Town 400 was held June 8 at Texas Motor Speedway. Todd Bodine won the pole, breaking Mike Skinner's six pole streak. The race was action-packed, and fuel mileage and strategy became a factor late in the race. With only a few laps to go, Travis Kvapil, looking for his first NCTS victory since 2004, was leading on a restart when he was bumped by Todd Bodine. Points leader Mike Skinner chased Bodine down but did not have enough for the eventual winner.

Top ten results:

Failed to qualify: None (35 entries)

Michigan 200
The Michigan 200 was held on June 16 at Michigan International Speedway. Travis Kvapil won the pole. The race was dominated by part-time Nextel Cup Series driver Mark Martin, who led for 35 laps before retiring with a blown engine. After Martin's exit, the race lead was handed over to another Cup driver, Kyle Busch, who appeared to have another truck win in sight but was battling an extremely loose truck. Eventually, after 99 laps of hard racing, polesitter Travis Kvapil took advantage of Busch's problems and passed him coming to the white flag. Kvapil would hold on to win his first race since 2004.

Top ten results:

Failed to qualify: Bryan Silas (No. 71)

Toyota Tundra Milwaukee 200
The Toyota Tundra Milwaukee 200 took place June 22 at the Milwaukee Mile. Mike Skinner won the pole. Like most races of the 2007 NCTS season, Mike Skinner dominated the first half of the race, leading 103 laps. However, defending winner Johnny Benson was looking to jumpstart his season. Benson Jr. would eventually pass Skinner just past the halfway mark and would not look back, leading 96 laps en route to his first victory of the season. Ted Musgrave suffered a 50-point penalty after intentionally wrecking another truck while under caution.

Top ten results:

Failed to qualify: None (36 entries)

O'Reilly 200
The O'Reilly 200 was held June 30 at Memphis Motorsports Park. Brad Keselowski won his first career pole. Subbing for a suspended Ted Musgrave, Keselowski had, as race analyst Phil Parsons called it, "the biggest night of his career". Keselowski was recommended by NASCAR veterans such as Mark Martin and Todd Bodine. He led the first 20 laps from pole before being passed by veteran Ron Hornaday Jr. However, as Ron's truck faded, Keselowski's got better and had the truck to beat, with his only competitor being 2002 Memphis winner Travis Kvapil. Brad was leading with 9 laps to go until Kvapil took advantage of Keselowski's loose truck and unintentionally spun him off at turn 4. Keselowski would end the bittersweet night in 16th. With the polesitter out of contention, the race was in the hands of Kvapil, who held off a hard charging Jack Sprague to win.

Top ten results:

Failed to qualify: None (36 entries)

Built Ford Tough 225 presented by Greater Cincinnati Ford Dealers
The Built Ford Tough 225 took place on July 14 at Kentucky Speedway. Ryan Mathews won his first career pole. However, it was African American driver Bill Lester to lead the first lap as Mathews struggled on restarts all night. As a testament to the competitive nature at Kentucky Speedway, there were four lead changes in the first eight laps of the race. The race, like many others, would end up being dominated by Mike Skinner, who led the field for 135 of 150 laps en route to cruising to his fourth win of the season. Travis Kvapil suffered a 25-point penalty for an illegal part found in his truck during post race inspection.

Top ten results:

Failed to qualify: None (36 entries)

Power Stroke Diesel 200
The Power Stroke Diesel 200 took place July 27 at O'Reilly Raceway Park. Mike Skinner won the pole as qualifying was rained out and set by owners points.

Top ten results:

Failed to qualify: Bradley Riethmeyer (No. 53)

Toyota Tundra 200
The Toyota Tundra 200 took place August 11 at Nashville Superspeedway. Mike Skinner won the pole. Skinner dominated the race, leading the first 102 laps. However, multiple encounters with lap traffic hampered his chances for victory, and 2003 NCTS champ Travis Kvapil took the lead from him on a green flag run. During the final 50 lap stretch, Kvapil held off restart master Ron Hornaday Jr. to take his first win at Nashville. Kvapil later dedicated the race to Bobby Hamilton who won the race in 2004 en route to his championship.

Top ten results:

Failed to qualify: None (36 entries)

O'Reilly Auto Parts 200 presented by Valvoline Maxlife
The O'Reilly 200 presented by Valvoline Maxlife was held August 22 at the newly repaved Bristol Motor Speedway. Travis Kvapil won the pole. The resurfacing of BMS would present exciting racing in the 200-lap race. With the old concrete, there was much more single file racing on the bottom groove, but the new progressively banked surface allowed for the use of the outside lane, which had not been used in years. From the start, it seemed as though Kvapil would walk away with another victory. However, crew chief for the No. 23 Toyota, Trip Bruce, had other ideas. Calling his driver, Johnny Benson, onto pit road on lap 40 with other trucks having pitted on a previous caution, race analyst Michael Waltrip criticized his plan, writing them out of contention. With 30 to go, however, the entire race would change. Nextel Cup Series regular Kyle Busch and Kvapil battled for the lead, but Busch's loose truck caused him to slide into Kvapil, sending them both spinning. This incident handed the lead to a charging Benson Jr.. Not even a red flag for a spin by Todd Bodine could stop "JB" who held off Brendan Gaughan and defending winner Mark Martin for his second victory in 2007.

Top ten results:

Failed to qualify: Brian Sockwell (No. 54)

Missouri/Illinois Dodge Dealers Ram Tough 200
The Missouri/Illinois Dodge Dealers Ram Tough 200 was held September 1 at Gateway International Raceway. Mike Skinner won the pole. Although Skinner would lead the first 19 laps, his chances of victory would end with a cut right front tire, sending him hard into the wall. Skinner, with his crew, would repair the truck and later return to the race. With Skinner in the garage, the race lead would turn to his championship rival, Ron Hornaday Jr., who dominated the race. However, fellow contender Johnny Benson took advantage of Hornaday's loose truck, passing him with 13 laps to go and holding of the "Restart Master" for his second consecutive win, albeit under caution, as Ryan Mathews crashed on the final lap.

Top ten results:

Failed to qualify: None (36 entries)

New Hampshire 200
The New Hampshire 200 was held September 15 at New Hampshire International Speedway. As qualifying was rained out, Ron Hornaday Jr. won the pole based on owners points. From pole, Hornaday crushed the field, leading 174 of 200 laps en route to his second win of the season. Hornaday also became the first repeat NCTS winner at Loudon and extended his points lead over Mike Skinner by 29 points.

Top ten results:

Failed to qualify: Sean Caisse (No. 03)

Smith's Las Vegas 350
The Smith's Las Vegas 350 was held September 22 at the Las Vegas Motor Speedway. Travis Kvapil won the pole. This race marked the historic debut of two open wheel drivers, 1995 Indianapolis 500 winner Jacques Villeneuve and 1996 Indianapolis 500 winner Buddy Lazier. This race also highlighted the tight points championship between two former champions in Ron Hornaday Jr. and Mike Skinner, with Skinner trailing by 29 points. With the new repaved surface, exciting 2 and 3 wide racing was expected. In his debut, Villeneuve impressed many by starting 7th. However, he was involved in an altercation with the No. 16 of Brian Scott and would finish 21st. Lazier would also struggle, going down a lap early and finishing 24th. The early run had the typical affair of Todd Bodine, Travis Kvapil, Ron Hornaday Jr., and even Chad McCumbee running up front. However, trucks such as those of Jon Wood and Stacy Compton would later reach the front. Wood, who was running part-time in the trucks after an illness, took command of the race, holding off championship contenders such as Johnny Benson and Kvapil. With Skinner struggling with his truck, it looked like Hornaday would extend his points lead heading into Talladega. However, a blown tire with 11 to go not only erased Hornaday's point lead, but gave Mike Skinner a 3-point advantage. Within the race, the win would come down to the trucks of Jon Wood, Travis Kvapil, and Johnny Benson. Wood exhausted the truck throughout the run and would have nothing left for Kvapil and Benson Jr., settling for 3rd. Benson Jr., going for his fourth win of the season, charged Kvapil from the low line, but Kvapil had enough momentum to hold off Benson Jr. for his fourth win of 2007.

Top ten results:

Failed to qualify: None (36 entries)

NOTE: Bobby Dotter replaced Casey Kingsland in the No. 06 in the race.

Mountain Dew 250
The Mountain Dew 250 was held on October 6 at Talladega Superspeedway. Todd Bodine won the pole. Of note,  Formula One world champion Jacques Villeneuve made another strong statement in qualifying 10th for the race. Tight packs of 2, 3, and even 4 wide racing was anticipated, based on the excitement of the inaugural race in 2006. The championship race between Mike Skinner, Ron Hornaday Jr., Travis Kvapil, and defending champion Todd Bodine continued to tighten. The pivotal point in the race came on lap 73 as Jack Sprague, who is in the midst of a difficult year, cut a tire down while leading. Johnny Benson, who ironically pushed Sprague to the win at Daytona, got into the back of his slowing car, triggering "The Big One". The crash collected contenders Hornaday and Kvapil, although the former was able to rally to a top 10 finish. After the crash, points leader Skinner had problems in the form of a loosened hood pin. The pin eventually broke off and his hood began to flap wildly, prompting NASCAR to black flag him. However, as soon as Skinner was about to pit under green, the truck of Mike Wallace spun, allowing Skinner to remain on the lead lap. With only two laps to go, the racing became tighter than ever, as Rick Crawford and Benson Jr. would use the draft to go three wide with Bodine in the tri-oval, but Crawford would come up short by only 0.014 seconds.

Top ten results:

Failed to qualify: None (36 entries)

Kroger 200
The Kroger 200 was held October 20 at Martinsville Speedway. Defending winner Jack Sprague won the pole. This race marked the NASCAR debut of 2007 Indianapolis 500 winner and 2007 IndyCar Series champion Dario Franchitti. The race would be dominated by Terry Cook, using a no stop strategy similar to the one Dennis Setzer used to win earlier in the year at Mansfield Motorsports Speedway. With huge accidents taking out both Franchitti and Jacques Villeneuve, and a scary crash involving Tim Sauter, the race would be decided by a bump. Exiting the second turn with two to go, Sprague tried to pull a bump and run on Cook. It was successful, but it allowed former points leader Mike Skinner to slip past both drivers and sweep both races at Martinsville.

Top ten results:

Failed to qualify: Jason White (No. 7), Tim Cowen (No. 42), Davin Scites (No. 06), Cory Collum (No. 32), Joe Ruttman (No. 53), John Coffman (No. 58)

EasyCare Vehicle Service Contracts 200
The EasyCare Vehicle Service Contracts 200 was held October 27 at Atlanta Motor Speedway. Ron Hornaday Jr. won the pole. As the epic points battle between Hornaday and Mike Skinner continued, the battle would seem to run in favor of Hornaday, who led 51 laps. However, lurking would be the No. 51 truck of Kyle Busch, who led the race high of 65 laps. However, before sailing to his second consecutive Atlanta victory, Kyle would have a major problem. For most of the latter half of the race, Busch put on a stellar performance, not only running up front but holding up his window net up with his left hand. In the end, it would be of no use, as NASCAR officials eventually black flagged Busch. Right before he pitted, Busch got a break in the form of a caution. This allowed him to rectify the window net problem and stay in contention. Busch would later pull off the pass of "King of Restarts" Hornaday with 7 laps to go, ironically on a restart. Busch would hold on to become the first Nextel Cup Series driver to win a Truck Series race in 2007.

Top ten results:

Failed to qualify: None (36 entries)

Silverado 350K
The Silverado 350K was held November 2 at Texas Motor Speedway. Mike Skinner won the pole. Although the early part of the race would be dominated by Ted Musgrave, the overall race would primarily be dominated by championship contenders Skinner and Ron Hornaday Jr., with Skinner leading the most laps at 40. This race also saw the championship hopes of Travis Kvapil and Todd Bodine end. As with most Friday night truck races under the lights, the final few laps created a fast and crazy finish. On a restart with 8 to go, Skinner would challenge the Hornaday for the lead on the outside heading onto the backstretch. However, Chad McCumbee made a bold move on both championship contenders, making it three wide heading into turn 3. As McCumbee took the lead, Hornaday sailed up the racetrack and into Skinner, causing a pileup involving Musgrave, Matt Crafton, and Erik Darnell. After the red flag was lifted, McCumbee spun his tires on the green-white-checkered restart. With two-time Texas winner Jack Sprague right behind him, McCumbee attempted to block Sprague, who subsequently hooked his quarter panel, sending them both into the wall. McCumbee would take 13th place while Sprague got 6th. Avoiding the carnage, Musgrave would take the checkered flag for the first time in 66 races. After the first wreck, polesitter Skinner would amazingly rally to finish third and extend his points lead.

Top ten results:

Failed to qualify: Wayne Edwards (No. 12)

Casino Arizona 150
The Casino Arizona 150 was held November 9 at Phoenix International Raceway. Mike Skinner won his record-breaking eleventh pole. The Skinner vs. Hornaday title fight would continue here, as controversy was throughout the race. First, Hornaday's teammate/owner, Kevin Harvick, drove through Skinner's pit stall to get to his pit. Although this is legal, it caused Skinner's entire crew to lose their timing, dropping him out of the top 10. The biggest crash of the night came with only 13 laps left. Jacques Villeneuve made contact with Stacy Compton, turning him into the frontstretch wall. Grand-Am driver Andy Lally was struck by Compton's truck, forcing him hard into the inside barrier, which broke apart. After the subsequent red flag to fix the wall, Kyle Busch would come into the picture, holding off Hornaday and Mike Bliss for the win. More controversy would occur outside of the top 5, as Johnny Benson, Skinner's teammate, passed him late in the race despite the looming championship.

Top ten results:

Failed to qualify: Tim Schendel (No. 31), Jason White (No. 7)

Ford 200
The Ford 200 was held November 16 at Homestead-Miami Speedway. The championship battle between Mike Skinner and Ron Hornaday Jr. concluded here. This also kicked off the first of the three days known as "Ford Championship Weekend". The three-way fight for Rookie of the Year concluded here, the contestants being Busch Series veteran Tim Sauter, and short track racers Willie Allen and Joey Clanton. Jon Wood won the pole, setting a new track record with a time of 31.180 at a speed of 173.188 mph. Open wheel export Jacques Villeneuve continued to show his qualifying expertise, starting third. Championship contenders Skinner and Hornaday started fourth and eighth, respectively.

Skinner would prove to have a difficult race, first having to pit for a flat right side tire and then having a left rear tire come completely off the truck. Due to these problems Skinner would finish 35th, while Hornaday would finish 7th and take the championship. Johnny Benson would pass Kyle Busch at the white flag to take his fourth win of '07. Hornaday's championship would tie future teammate Jack Sprague for most NCTS championships with 3.

Top ten results:

Failed to qualify: Scott Lynch (No. 63), Kevin Lepage (No. 86), Tim Schendel (No. 31), Jason White (No. 7), Bryan Silas (No. 71)

Full Drivers' Championship

(key) Bold – Pole position awarded by time. Italics – Pole position set by owner's points. * – Most laps led.

Rookies
As noted above, the two main contenders for ROTY, Aaron Fike and Tyler Walker, were both suspended by NASCAR for violating its drug abuse policy. The two main contenders for the title would then be ex-Busch Series driver Tim Sauter and sprint car driver Willie Allen. The fight would come down to the final race, where Allen would prevail by nine points over Sauter. Although Joey Clanton was in contention for the rookie title, he was running only a partial season in the No. 09. Other contenders, such as Jason White, Ryan Mathews, and Blake Bjorklund also ran partial seasons.

See also

2007 NASCAR Nextel Cup Series
2007 NASCAR Busch Series
2007 NASCAR Busch East Series
2007 NASCAR Canadian Tire Series
2007 NASCAR Corona Series

References

External links
Truck Series Standings and Statistics for 2007

NASCAR Truck Series seasons